David "Dai" Royston "Roy" Bevan (2 January 1928 – 12 April 2008) was a Welsh rugby union, and professional rugby league footballer who played in the 1950s.

Playing career

International honours
Dai Bevan won caps for Wales (RL) while at Wigan 1953 2-caps, and won a cap for Great Britain (RL) while at Wigan in 1952 against Australia.

Dai Bevan also represented Great Britain while at Wigan/Halifax between 1952 and 1956 against France (1 non-Test match).

Championship final appearances
Dai Bevan played for Wigan during the 1951–52 season, but not in Wigan's 13–6 victory over Dewsbury in the Rugby Football League Championship Final during the 1951–52 season at Leeds Road, Huddersfield on Saturday 10 May 1952.

Challenge Cup Final appearances
Dai Bevan played , i.e. number 5, in Halifax's 4–4 draw with Warrington in the 1954 Challenge Cup Final during the 1953–54 season at Wembley Stadium, London on Saturday 24 April 1954, in front of a crowd of 81,841, and played  in the 4–8 defeat by Warrington in the 1954 Challenge Cup Final replay during the 1953–54 season at Odsal Stadium, Bradford on Wednesday 5 May 1954, in front of a record crowd of 102,575 or more.

Club career
Dai Bevan made his début for Wigan on Wednesday 2 April 1952, he played his last game for Wigan on Saturday 10 October 1953, he was transferred from Wigan to Halifax, and he played his last game for Halifax during 1956.

Personal life
Bevan's birth was registered during first ¼ 1928 in Pontypridd district
Following his retirement from rugby league, Dai Bevan lived in Middleton near Rochdale, and became a teacher at Moorclose School (now named Middleton Technical School), he died on 12 April 2008, aged 80, in Heywood near Rochdale. The funeral was on Monday 21 April 2008 at Rochdale Crematorium.

References

External links
!Great Britain Statistics at englandrl.co.uk (statistics currently missing due to not having appeared for both Great Britain, and England)
Statistics at wigan.rlfans.com

1928 births
2008 deaths
Footballers who switched code
Great Britain national rugby league team players
Halifax R.L.F.C. players
People from Heywood, Greater Manchester
Rugby league players from Pontypridd
Rugby league wingers
Rugby union players from Pontypridd
Wales national rugby league team players
Welsh rugby league players
Welsh rugby union players
Welsh schoolteachers
Wigan Warriors players